Daekyeung College is located in Gyeongsan, Republic  of Korea.

History
Jan. 08, 1992 Jungam School Corporation founded
Mar. 05, 1993 Daekyeung College opened
May 15, 1998 Launched Products of “LAGOSOL”, the university's first own brand
Jan. 26, 1999 Entered into an agreement with IBM/LOTUS as its official educational institution
Nov. 30, 2004 TK Wine Research Center completed
May 21, 2007 Won the Grand Prize in the 1st Employment Contest of Gyeongsangbuk-do
Mar. 26, 2010 Selected for programs the reinforce vocational colleges’ educational capacities in 2010 by the Ministry of Education, Science and Technology

Departments

Division of Performance Arts
Theatre and Film
Musical Theatre
Broadcasting System
Entertainment & Event Management
Practical Music
Practical Dance
Model
Fashion Specialist

Division of Physical Education
Security Administration
Sport & Health Science 
Taekwondo
Sport for All

Division of Applied Marketing & Entertainment
Visual Merchandising 
Internet Gaming
Online Marketing
Automobile Dealership
Entertainment & Event
Fashion Specialist
Fashion Shopping Mall

Division of Humanities and Social Studies
Early Childhood Education
Military Officer
Police Administration
Social Welfare
Secretary Management

Division of Beauty & Wellness Art Make-Up
Hair Design
Make-Up
Cosmetology
Art Make-Up
Animal Training & Event

Division of Health
Nursing
Clinical Pathology
Optometry
Hospital Administration
Speech & Language Rehabilitation

Division of Hospitality
Aircraft Cabin Service Management
Hotel Management
Tourism & Cruise Management

Division of Culinary Arts
Hotel Culinary
Cook Mastery
Hotel Bakery & Pastry
Wine & Coffee Barista

Notable alumni
 Lee Dong-Hyun, football Player
 Lee Min-ki, actor and model
 Kim Woo-bin, actor and model
 Jang Hyuk-Jin, football  player
 Ahn Bo-hyun, actor
 Choi Woong, actor
Choi Young-jae (born 1996), South Korean actor and singer, member of GOT7 
 Hoya (Lee Ho-dong), actor and singer (Infinite)
 Jang Dongwoo, singer (Infinite)
 Jang Mi-kwan, model and actor
 Kim Sung-kyu, singer (Infinite)
 L (Kim Myung-soo), actor and singer (Infinite)
 Lee Sung-yeol, actor and singer (Infinite)
 Yugyeom (Kim Yu-gyeom), singer (Got7)
Kim Wonpil, singer (DAY6)
 Smeb (Song Kyung-ho), professional League of Legends player

References
2. Daekyeung College. 
    dk.ac.kr (in Korean).
    Retrieved. 2020-08-17.
    Gyeongsan